Fabio Sakaj (born 2 February 1998) is an Italian-born Albanian professional footballer who plays as a central midfielder and currently plays for Vis Artena in Serie D. He represents the Albania national under-21 team.

Early life & Youth career
Sakaj was born in Alatri, a comune of province of Frosinone in the Italian region of the Lazio, to Albanian parents originally from Lezhë, Albania. He started his football at the Virtus Pavullese, a small football team in the town of Pavullo Nel Frignano, in the Italian province of Modena. He moved at Modena academy and in 2014 became part of the Primavera team under coach Simone Barone.

Club career

Modena
Sakaj gained entry with the first team of Modena F.C. as he was included in the team by the coach Simone Pavan to participate in the match against Brescia on 3 March 2015. Then he continued to participate regularly in 6 another matches, until he managed to make its debut against Virtus Entella on 11 April 2015 by coming on as a substitute in the stoppage time 90'+2 minute in place of Pablo Granoche.

On 5 November 2017, Modena declared bankrupt after failing to pay player wages or stadium bills which brought about a player strike and a stadium lockout. The club had not attended the previous three Serie C matches, including not attending the match against Santarcangelo Calcio; with a total of four matches not attended, the club were officially excluded from "Lega Pro" on 6 November.

Fondi
On 11 December 2017, he signed with Racing Fondi as a free agent.

International career
Sakaj received his first call up to the Albania national under-19 team by coach Arjan Bellaj for the friendly tournament Roma Caput Mundi from 29 February–4 March 2016.

Sakaj received his first call up at Albania national under-21 football team by coach Alban Bushi for a gathering in Durrës, Albania from 18 to 25 January 2017.

He received his first call up for the Albania under-20 side by coach Alban Bushi for the double friendly match against Azerbaijan U-21 on 21 & 26 January 2018.

Career statistics

Club

References

External links

1998 births
Living people
People from Alatri
Italian people of Albanian descent
Albanian footballers
Albania youth international footballers
Association football midfielders
Association football forwards
Modena F.C. players
S.S. Racing Club Fondi players
Serie B players
Serie C players
Serie D players
Footballers from Lazio
Sportspeople from the Province of Frosinone